Formula One World Championship results for the BRM Formula One team and BRM cars entered by other teams.

Complete Formula One World Championship results

Works team results
(key)
Notes

Other BRM cars
(key)

As an engine supplier
(key)
Notes

References 

Formula One constructor results